DXDA (94.3 FM), broadcasting as 94.3 Charm Radio, is a radio station owned and operated by the Polytechnic Foundation of Cotabato and Asia. The station's studio is located at the 3rd Floor, Cagas Bldg., Rizal Ave., Digos.

References

Radio stations established in 2008
Radio stations in Davao del Sur